Melica smithii (Smith's melic grass) is a species of grass that grows in the Canadian provinces Alberta, British Columbia, Quebec, Ontario, and the US states Idaho, Michigan, Montana, South Dakota, Washington, Wisconsin, and Wyoming. The species is named after Charles Eastwick Smith.

Description
The species have scabrous leaf-sheaths and leaf-blades, with the last one being lax as well. They are also distant and naked and sometimes  reflexed.

Habitat
Can be found deciduous forests amongst beech, maple, and hemlock trees.

Threat level
In Wisconsin the species is considered to be endangered.

References

smithii
Bunchgrasses of North America
Grasses of the United States
Grasses of Canada